The Shire of Arapiles was a local government area in the Wimmera region of western Victoria, Australia.

History

Arapiles was initially the West Riding of the Shire of Wimmera, as incorporated in 1862. It was severed and incorporated separately on 25 May 1888. It gained parts of Wimmera's South Riding on 30 May 1913.

On 20 January 1995, the Shire of Arapiles was abolished, and along with the City of Horsham and parts of the Shires of Kowree and Wimmera, was merged into the newly created Rural City of Horsham. The section west of Nhill-Harrow Road was transferred to the newly created Shire of West Wimmera.

Wards

The Shire of Arapiles was divided into three ridings, each of which elected three councillors:
 North Riding
 Central Riding
 South Riding

Towns and localities
 Clear Lake
 Connangorach
 Duchembegarra
 Grass Flat
 Jallumba
 Lower Norton
 Mitre
 Mockinya
 Mount Arapiles
 Natimuk*
 Noradjuha
 Nurrabiel
 Tooan

* Council seat.

Population

* Estimates in 1958, 1983 and 1988 Victorian Year Books.

References

External links
 Victorian Places - Arapiles Shire

Arapiles
1888 establishments in Australia